This is a list of electrical generating stations in Nunavut, Canada.

Qulliq Energy, a government-owned corporation,  is the only electrical power provider that serves the remote communities that demographically comprise Nunavut. Qulliq, has a total of 25 power plants, each containing multiple diesel generators. This arrangement serves a total of 25 communities. The territory is not connected to the North American power grid.

Diesel 

List of all power plants using diesel generators in Nunavut. (Each station consists of a building that contains three or more engine-generator units.)

See also 

 Energy in Canada
 List of electrical generating stations in Canada

References 

Lists of power stations in Canada